Rhacophorus bifasciatus is a species of frog in the family Rhacophoridae endemic to Indonesia. Its natural habitats are subtropical or tropical moist lowland forests, subtropical or tropical moist montane forests, and rivers. It is threatened by habitat loss.

References

Amphibians of Indonesia
bifasciatus
Taxonomy articles created by Polbot
Amphibians described in 1923